Ewha Womans University Station is a station on the Seoul Subway Line 2. As its name indicates, it serves the nearby Ewha Womans University, although Sinchon Station on the Gyeongui-Jungang Line is closer to the school. Although technically the station has one island platform with both rail tracks running on opposite sides, the two boarding areas with screen doors are essentially blocked off from each other, and are connected only by a few long and narrow passageways. Some people mistake this station to have two side platforms that are adjacent to each other.

Nearby Shopping Area

As many schools and residential buildings are close to Ewha Woman's University Station, there are many shops selling clothes at relatively low price. The main street selling clothes is named Ewhayeodae 5-gil.

Station layout

References

Seoul Metropolitan Subway stations
Railway stations opened in 1984
Metro stations in Mapo District
Metro stations in Seodaemun District
Ewha Womans University
1984 establishments in South Korea
20th-century architecture in South Korea